Polypedates himalayensis, the Himalayan tree frog, is a species of tree frog found in north-eastern India. A typical frog found in moist deciduous forest. This frog also found in semi-urban, especially in cities with extensive gardens or plants.
Formerly, it was considered as a subspecies of the Indian tree frog. It is associated with freshwater habitat.

References

himalayensis
Frogs of India
Amphibians described in 1998